Uroteuthis duvaucelii, also known as the Indian Ocean Squid or Indian Squid,  is an Indo-West Pacific species of squid with a wide range throughout the Indian Ocean to Malaysia and the South China Sea, and is also present in the Red Sea and the Arabian Sea. U. duvaucelii is found at depths between 3 m and 170 m and feeds on fishes, crustaceans and other squids. Individuals have mantles moderately long (commonly up to 150 mm) and slender with broad fins approximately 50% of the mantle length.

U. duvaucelii represents a significant species in commercial fisheries throughout its range: e.g. catches of squid in the Philippines commercial fishery are 90% U. duvaucelii.

Life cycle
During brooding fertilized embryos hatch into a planktonic stage migrating into the upper layers of the water column. As they grow larger they take up a benthic existence as adults, with males being slightly larger than females.

Spawning occurs throughout the year but principally in spring and autumn. It is initiated by males performing various displays to attract potential females. During copulation, a male grasps the female and inserts the hectocotylus into the female's mantle cavity where fertilization usually occurs. Adult males usually then die shortly after spawning, whilst females survive for a short while until after brooding.

The life cycle of U. duvaucelii lasts around 1 year although this can vary due to environmental factors.

References

External links

Tree of Life web project: Uroteuthis

Squid
Molluscs described in 1945